This is a list of special economic zones by country.

Bangladesh

Several special economic zones (SEZs) have been established across Bangladesh since the 1980s.

Mandated by the Bangladesh Economic Zones Act, 2010, the Bangladesh Economic Zones Authority (BEZA) was officially instituted by the government on 9 November 2010. BEZA aims to establish SEZs in all potential areas in Bangladesh including underdeveloped regions with a view to encouraging rapid economic development through increase and diversification of industry, employment, production and export.

Bangladesh government has taken an initiative to introduce a hundred SEZ throughout the country. As of March 2016, thirty seven government SEZs have acquired land and are under development.

The following Eight EPZs are in operation:

Adamjee Export Processing Zone, Siddhirganj, Narayanganj
Chittagong Export Processing Zone, South Halishahar, Chittagong
Comilla Export Processing Zone, Comilla
Dhaka Export Processing Zone, Savar, Dhaka
Ishwardi Export Processing Zone, Ishwardi, Pabna
Karnaphuli Export Processing Zone, North Patenga, Chittagong
Mongla Export Processing Zone, Mongla, Bagerhat
Uttara Export Processing Zone, Nilphamari

BEPZA is currently working on Mirsharai Economic Zone project to expand the opportunities for the investors to invest and create employment in a business-friendly environment.

Belarus
Belarus has a SEZ called the China-Belarus Industrial Park.

Botswana
Currently identified areas for SEZs are:

 Gaborone (adjacent to the Sir Seretse Khama International Airport)- International diamond hub
 Gaborone Fairgrounds- Financial Services in Gaborone.
 Lobatse- Beef, leather and biogas park.
 Greater Palapye in Palapye- Integrated coal value addition;
 Selebi Phikwe- Mineral beneficiation.
 Tuli Block- Horticulture, Agro Business:
 Francistown- Mining supplies, services and logistics hub.
 Pandamatenga- Integrated farming, agro business and food processing.

Cambodia
Formally introduced in 2005, there are 22 SEZs in Cambodia as of November 2014. They are listed below followed by the province in which they are located.

Sihanoukville Special Economic Zone (SSEZ),Sihanoukville
Sihanoukville Port SEZ, Sihanoukville
Neang Kok Koh Kong SEZ, Koh Kong
Suoy Chheng SEZ, Koh Kong
S.N.C. SEZ, Sihanoukville
Stung Hav SEZ, Sihanoukville
N.L.C. SEZ, Svay Rieng
Manhattan (Svay Reing) SEZ, Svay Rieng
Poipet O’Neang SEZ, Banteay Meanchey
Doung Chhiv Phnom Den SEZ, Takeo
Phnom Penh SEZ, Phnom Penh
Kampot SEZ, Kampot
Sihanoukville SEZ 1, Sihanoukville
Tai Seng Bavet SEZ Svay Rieng
Oknha Mong SEZ, Koh Kong
Goldfame Pak Shun SEZ, Kandal
Thary Kampong Cham SEZ, Kampong Cham
Sihanoukville SEZ 2, Sihanoukville
D&M Bavet SEZ, Svay Rieng
Kiri Sakor Koh Kong SEZ, Koh Kong
Kampong Saom SEZ, Sihanoukville
Pacific SEZ, Svay Rieng

Cayman Islands
The Cayman Enterprise City SEZ officially launched on Friday, 3 February 2012. It specializes in knowledge based industries. The SEZ has a range of incentives to attract businesses including no corporate, income or capital gains tax.

China

The most prominent SEZs in the country are Hainan Province and the cities of Kashgar, Shantou, Shenzhen, Xiamen, and Zhuhai. It is notable that Shantou, Shenzhen, and Zhuhai are all in Guangdong Province, and all are on the southern coast of China where the sea is very accessible for transportation of goods.

Cuba
Mariel Special Development Zone is a special economic zone under construction in Cuba, with the intention to attract foreign investment.

Democratic Republic of the Congo

Democratic Republic of the Congo planned to build its first Special Economic Zone in the Kinshasa district of N'Sélé. The SEZ was intended be operative in 2012 and dedicated to agro-industries.

As of April 2013 the DRC did not have any FTZs or free ports.

Greece
The German government is pushing for the creation of special economic zones in Greece and other European countries with struggling economies.

Egypt
The North West Suez Special Economic Zone (SSEZ) is located at the Red Sea, 45 km south of Suez. It is served by Sokhna harbour. It was the first SEZ set up under laws passed in 2002.

Additionally, in 2013 Egypt had nine FZs and thirteen Investment Zones.

Eswatini 
1. Royal Science and Technology Park Special Economic Zone

2. Eswatini Civil Aviation Authority (ESWACAA)

The Royal Science and Technology Park - SEZ

The Royal Science and Technology Park (RSTP) was designated as a Special Economic Zone through the Special Economic Zone Act of 2018. This was an initiative by His Majesty King Mswati III to attract foreign investment into the Kingdom of Eswatini, promote export-oriented growth, generate employment with the intention to ensure technology transfer to the Eswatini populace, subsequently boost economic growth. The Investor Management Services Unit is responsible for the operationalization and management of RSTP’s SEZ Industrial Plot and the One Stop Shop Service Centre (OSSSC).

Ethiopia
Ethiopia has a SEZ named Oriental in Dukem (near Addis) that produces electrical machinery, construction materials, steel and metallurgy. The zone is wholly owned by China.

Honduras
Roatán contains a Zona de Empleo y de Desarrollo Económico (ZEDE) or Zone for Economic Development and Employment, designated by Honduran constitutional provisions and legislation.  The goal is to enable stable legal structures, physical environment, human rights, and taxation in order to encourage investment, migration, and economic development. This is the location of the private charter city of Próspera.

India

India was one of the first countries in Asia to recognize the effectiveness of the Export Processing Zone (EPZ) model in promoting exports, with Asia's first EPZ set up in Kandla in 1965. In order to overcome the shortcomings experienced on account of the multiplicity of controls and clearances; absence of world-class infrastructure, and an unstable fiscal regime and with a view to attract larger foreign investments in India, the Special Economic Zones (SEZs) Policy was announced in April 2000.

A comprehensive draft SEZ Bill was prepared after extensive discussions with the stakeholders. A number of meetings were held in various parts of the country both by the Minister for Commerce and Industry as well as senior officials for this purpose. The draft SEZ Rules were widely discussed and put on the website of the Department of Commerce. Around 800 suggestions were received on the draft rules.

SEZ Act provides for customs duty on services cleared into DTAIt was hoped that the bill would instill confidence in investors and signal the Government's commitment to a stable SEZ policy regime. Thereby generating greater economic activity and employment through their establishment.

The Special Economic Zones Act was passed by the Government of India in May 2005, it received Presidential assent on the 23rd of June, 2005. While introducing the act, then prime minister of India, Dr. Manmohan Singh, said:“SEZs are here to stay”.

The bill came into effect on 10 February 2006, providing for drastic simplification of procedures and for single window clearance on matters relating to central as well as state governments. The remaining part of India, not covered by the SEZ Rules, is known as the Domestic tariff area. Exports from Indian SEZ totalled INR 2.2 Trillion in 2009-10 fiscal. It grew by 43% to reach INR 3.16 Trillion in 2010-11 fiscal. Indian SEZs have created over 840,000 jobs as of 2010-11. Exports through Indian SEZs grew further by 15.4% to reach INR 3.64 Trillion (roughly US$66 billion). As of 2011-12 fiscal, investments worth over US$36.5 billion (INR 2.02 Trillion) have been made in these tax-free enclaves. Exports of Indian SEZs have experienced a growth of 50.5% for the past eight fiscals from US$2.5 billion in 2003-04 to about US$65 billion in 2011-12 (accounting for 23% of India's total exports).

Special Economic Zone as per Central Sales Tax, 1956 --> A Special Economic Zone (SEZ) is a geographically bound zone where the economic laws relating to export and import are more liberal as compared to other parts of the country. These are like a separate island within the territory of India. SEZs are projected as duty-free area for the purpose of trade, operations, duty, and tariffs. SEZ is considered to be a place outside India for all tax purpose. Within SEZs, a unit may be set-up for the manufacture of goods and other activities including processing, assembling, trading, repairing, reconditioning, making of gold/silver, platinum jewellery etc. As per law, SEZ units are deemed to be outside the customs territory of India. Goods and services coming into SEZs from the domestic tariff area or DTA are treated as exports from India and goods and services rendered from the SEZ to the DTA are treated as imports into India.

The objectives of SEZs can be explained as: 
 Generation of additional economic activity;
 Promotion of exports of goods and services;
 Promotion of investment from domestic and foreign sources;
 Creation of employment opportunities;
 Development of infrastructure facilities.

The incentives and facilities available to SEZ developers include: 
 Exemption from customs/excise duties for development of SEZs for authorized operations approved by the BOA.
 Income Tax exemption on income derived from the business of development of the SEZ in a block of 10 years in 15 years under Section 80-IAB of the Income Tax Act.
 Exemption from minimum alternate tax under Section 115 JB of the Income Tax Act.
 Exemption from dividend distribution tax under Section 115O of the Income Tax Act.
 Exemption from Central Sales Tax (CST).
 Exemption from Service Tax (Section 7, 26 and Second Schedule of the SEZ Act).

There were about 143 SEZs (as of June 2012) operating throughout India, by February 2016 this had risen to 187. 634 SEZs have been approved for implementation by the Government of India (as of June 2012).

Indonesia
There are 19 Special Economic Zones in Indonesia that have been approved. 

 Arun Lhokseumawe
 Sei Mangkei
 Galang Batang
 Nongsa
 Batam Aero Technic (BAT) 
 Tanjung Kelayang
 Tanjung Lesung
 Kendal
 Sanur
 Singosari
 Mandalika
 Maloy Batuta Trans Kalimantan (MBTK) 
 Palu
 Bitung
 Likupang
 Morotai
 Sorong
 Gresik 
 Lido

Iran

Iran's interest in free trade and special economic zones can be traced back to the 1970s. According to SOAS's Hassan Hakimian, "the FTZs are more ambitious in their objective of acting as magnets for the attraction of Foreign Direct Investment (FDI) and ultimately for generating a diversified industrial base and promoting Iran's non-oil exports, the SEZ are conceived for goods transit and improving the supply and distribution networks in the country."
 Arg-e-Jadid Special Economic Zone: Vehicle Manufacturing Hub.
 PetZone: Petrochemical special economic Zone, Bandar-e Mahshahr.
 Kish: Kish island special economic zone.
 KSEZ(Kaveh special economic zone)
 Sarakhs Special Economic Zone
 Sirjan
 Shahid Rajaee Port 
 Amirabad Special Economic Zone
 Bushehr Port
 Payam Special Economic Zone, closest SEZ to the capital city Tehran, with 3600 hec. area within 10000 hec. of Payam International Airport territory established in Karaj for development of air cargo and postal transportation, storage of goods, cold store, packing services, goods productivity, perishable and time sensitive goods export. Payam is the only SEZ in the region with the privilege of its own airport and airline. Adjacent to industrial, economical and agricultural center of Tehran, with easy access to railroad, underground and other related highways. In order to attract FDI Payam has created equal opportunity and possibility of investment for Iranian and foreign subjects on every scale of partnership, in addition guarantee foreign investment according to attraction and protection law of foreign investments and freedom of invest transfer and obtained income of it, with no administrative encumbrance laws. Furthermore, there is free entrance, without customs duties for goods, machinery and row material until it has been stationed in the zone, with possibility to export goods from zone without customs formalities.
 Abadan
 Astara
 Persian Gulf Mining and Metal Industries Special Economic Zone.P.G.S.E.Z. is located at km 13 of Shahid Rajaei Highway at the west of Bandar Abbas. It was established with the name of Mines and Metals Special Economic Zone on Jan. 14, 1998. Based on the decision made by the Council of Ministers, it changed to Persian Gulf Mineral and Metal Special Zone. On March 6, 2005 "Economic" was added and in early 2009, it charged into Mineral and Metal industries Economic Zone. The purpose of establishment of the zone has been providing conditions for absorption of domestic investment and foreign and conducting them toward establishment of industrial and mineral units, energy- intensive industries, processing of minerals and economic growth and development, increasing job opportunities, increase and development of modem technologies in the field of production, managerial skills, improving the quality of products and increase in the export capability for the purpose of competition in Global Markets are among the objectives being drawn.

Jamaica
The first of Jamaica's special economic zones was created in 1976 with the goal of industrializing the country, as well as increasing foreign exchange and access to technology. This primary zone was in Kingston and was strategically attached to one of the country's main ports, to facilitate efficient transportation. Although it is no longer in use, during its years of operation, the zone consisted of 146 acres of warehouse land, which could be rented by foreign enterprises at very low rates. Private companies were invited to occupy the warehouses, but the government at that time, The People's National Party, remained tentative of relying on foreign capital as a means of industrializing.

With the shift to the Seaga government in the 1980s, export led industrialization became key to Jamaica's economic development, and more effort was put into attracting foreign enterprises to the zone. One of the ways in which this was executed, was by transforming the warehouse land into a center for production of manufactured goods. While the Caribbean Development Bank and the World Bank funded the creation of the zone, the conversion into factories was initiated and paid for by the National Development Bank, a government-owned institution. Due to the large job creation that accompanied the transformation, a second SEZ was opened in Montego Bay in 1988. The majority of the activity, however, remained at the Kingston location, with only ten percent of the factories at the new, smaller site. The factories were primarily occupied by foreign enterprises, and produced apparel items, fish products, fruit juice concentrates and animal feed. As a result of the special economic zones, Jamaica's export of manufactured goods increased ten-fold between 1980 and 1984, although the export of traditional goods, namely bauxite and alumina, stagnated.

Foreign enterprises were attracted to the SEZs by the incentives they offered. The zones operated as separate entities that were not technically part of Jamaica, which allowed companies to bypass local import and exchange controls. Additionally, under the Jamaica Free Zone Act, any enterprise with approval from the Port Authority could import certain items without any customs duties. Any remaining local labour controls were of little concern to foreign companies, since Jamaican workers were typically excluded from all steps except for manufacturing. The materials used for apparel manufacturing, for example, were all imported from the United States and simply assembled by the local workers. The minimal role played by Jamaicans in the production also meant that there were very few backwards and forwards linkages. With the exception of fish products, which incorporated local resources, most of the companies imported their inputs from home or from Asia. Since these enterprises could execute their business with very little engagement with the country, there was no incentive for them to ameliorate Jamaican infrastructure or industry. The Seaga government argued that despite this lack of success in industrializing the country, the zones were effective in providing much-needed employment for the locals.

At its peak, the Kingston and Montego Bay Free Zones employed over 36,000 locals. However, they were criticized for issues of poor working conditions and low wages. The jobs that the factories provided were high pressure, laborious, and provided few opportunities for workers to gain new skills. Jamaican women made up 95 percent of the workforce in the zones, the majority of whom were under 25 years old. These women typically worked twelve-hour days, six days a week, with significant overtime expected. Throughout the mid-1980s, an average income in the zone was US$30 per two weeks, a wage that was comparable to other low-skill, entry-level jobs in Jamaica, but much less than the minimum wages of the countries that owned and operated the factories. Although the creation of these jobs did lift some families out of dire economic situations, the wages were not high enough to stop the cycle of poverty for most. In addition, the government taxed their incomes heavily for ‘health benefits’, yet no aid was provided when medical issues arose. This forced many locals to believe that the government was co-conspiring with foreign countries to exploit them, but without the adequate unionized backing, there was little they could do to fight these injustices. This lack of unionization also meant that many enterprises were not forced to comply with the Factory Act: Occupational issues that arose from poor working conditions, such as overheating, carpel tunnel syndrome, strained eyesight, or back problems, went unnoticed.

Although the workers had a fundamental right to create or join unions, the majority of the factories in the zones remained non-unionized. The International Labour Organization set out guidelines for ethical working conditions, but it was largely up to the Jamaican government to enforce them. Since low-wage female workers were not a priority, very little effort was made to support them. Some women did try to improve the conditions of the factories and were met with mixed success. A few factories started to provide maternity leave and some medical benefits; however, the majority remained unchanged. In response to strikes or labour movements, some companies dismissed their Jamaican workers and brought in workers from Asia who were less vocal about the injustices. This not only took jobs from the locals, one of the key goals behind creating the special economic zones, but also had deleterious effects on future movements to unionize the factories.

The creation of the North American Free Trade Agreement (NAFTA) in 1994 had significant impacts on the SEZs of Jamaica and can be seen as one of the main reasons for the closure of the Kingston site. Before this agreement, the United States had held a monopoly over the factory spaces, since the Caribbean Basin Economic Recovery Act of 1983-1995, allowed for one-way free trade benefits on most products entering the U.S. from the Caribbean. NAFTA gave its members (Canada, the United States and Mexico) similar trade privileges amongst each other that foreign countries received in Jamaica. The agreement made it more attractive for the United States to invest in Mexico than Jamaica and resulted in many of their companies moving to factories in there. Aside from the lower transportation costs between Mexico and the United States, in 1997, Mexican workers were being paid much less than Jamaican workers. In 1996, Jamaica's exports to the United States declined 12 percent, while Mexico's exports to the United States grew by 40 percent. Similarly, by the mid 1990s, employment in the special economic zones had declined 64 percent since its peak in 1987. The loss of 16,000 jobs between the years 1995-1997 was severely detrimental to the workers, who claimed they had been ‘ruined’ by health issues attributed to factory work, and were therefore not fit to pursue any other work. In response to the closure, the Jamaican government tried to promote export-oriented work like data processing and call centers, but neither venture was very successful and few jobs were created. As of February 2013, there has been talk of opening another SEZ in the Caymanas.

Latvia
Liepaja Special Economic Zone in Baltics consisting of sea-port, industrial area and international airport.

Rezekne Special Economic Zone in Baltics with crossroads of transport corridors in Latvia with direct access to international markets with more than 500 million consumers in the EU, Russia and CIS countries.

Malaysia
Malaysia launched an East Coast Economic Region (SEZ) in August 2009. The country's first Special Economic Zone is expected to contribute RM23 billion to the national GDP and create 220,000 new jobs in the ECER.
 Northern Corridor Economic Region (NCER)
 Iskandar Malaysia
 MSC Malaysia

Mauritius
A Chinese owned SEZ has been created in Jinfei called the Mauritius Jinfei Economic Trade and Cooperation Zone. The zone manufacturers textiles, garments, machinery and high-tech. Additionally, it supports trade, tourism and finance.

Mexico

In May, 2016, President Enrique Peña Nieto signed a new law for the creation of special economic zones to attract investment into certain southern states of the country. The first of the zones are the port of Lázaro Cárdenas, including neighboring municipalities in Michoacán and Guerrero; a corridor in the Isthmus of Tehuantepec between Coatzacoalcos, Veracruz, and Salina Cruz, Oaxaca, that includes both those cities; and the Pacific coast port of Puerto Chiapas. In 2017 another zone is to be created in the petroleum corridor of Tabasco-Campeche.

According to Vázquez Tercero & Zepeda, the Mexican Special Economic Zones regime will provide tax benefits, customs, and business facilitation measures, and possibly financial support to investors. Moreover, the federal government, in coordination with State and local authorities, will also implement parallel policies in the region, such as education, security, health, and infrastructure, in order to boost the competitiveness of the geographic location as well as to attract investment.

Myanmar

Special economic zones, which offer tax exemptions for different sectors (5 years for production, 8 years for high-tech, 2 years for agriculture, livestock breeding and forestry, and 1 year for banking) are undergoing preliminary construction in Sittwe Township and Kyaukpyu Township in Rakhine State. An international standard airport is also to be constructed. The six free trade zones will be Thilawa Port in Yangon, Mawlamyine in Mon State, Myawaddy and Hpa-an in Kayin State, Kyaukphyu in Rakhine State and Pyin Oo Lwin in Mandalay Region. According to the country's Special Economic Zone Law's Act 7, Section 36, homes and farming properties located on a proposed SEZ must be duly relocated and reimbursed.

The Myanmar Port Authority has been involved in facilitating contracts to develop Myanmar's Special Economic Zones, including a US$8.6 billion deal to develop a deep sea port at Dawei called the Dawei Port Project, by Italian-Thai Development).

Nepal

In Nepal SEZs laws were formulated in 2016 in the form of Special Economic Zone Act (2016). The laws were subsequently revised in 2019. The industries inside the Special Economic Zones are given various facilities and in return they have to commit to export a minimum of 60% of their production to the foreign market.

Nigeria
Two Chinese SEZs have been constructed in Nigeria.
 Centenary Economic City
 LADOL
 Nigeria International Commerce city

Democratic People's Republic of Korea (North Korea)
The Rajin-Sonbong Economic Special Zone was established under a UN economic development programme in 1994. Located on the bank of the Tuman River, the zone borders on the Yanbian Korean Autonomous Prefecture (or, Yeonbyeon in Korean) of the People's Republic of China, as well as Russia. In 2000 the name of the area was shortened to Rason and became separate from the North Hamgyeong Province. In 2013 and 2014 a number of smaller special economic zones were announced covering export handling, mineral processing, high technology, gaming and tourism.

North Korea also used to operate Kaesong Industrial Region in conjunction with South Korea from 2002 until 2016.

The State Academy of Sciences operates a special economic zone near Unjong Park in the northern suburbs of Pyongyang.

North Korea designated over a dozen new special economic zones in 2013 and 2014.

Pakistan
Taking the example of the Chinese success with their SEZs, China is helping Pakistan develop the RUBA SEZ on the outskirts of Lahore. RUBA SEZ PVT LTD is a subsidiary of RUBA Group of Companies and was expanded from existing Haier – RUBA Economic Zone.

Other economic zones include the China-Pakistan economic zone open only to Chinese investors in Gwadar, Pakistan.

There are talks of creating a Japanese city for investors from Japan only.

There has been new SEZ proposed on the under-construction Sialkot-Lahore motorway; Qatar has proposed an investment for $1 billion in a new SEZ along the motorway.

There is a new zone under construction in Faisalabad, which will be the biggest industrial estate of Pakistan when complete. It has sections for each country and the first phase is complete with a special Chinese zone in it.

Special economic zones in Pakistan:
 Karachi Export Processing Zone, Karachi, Sindh
 Risalpur Export Processing Zone, Risalpur
 Sialkot Export Processing Zone, Sialkot, Punjab
 Gujranwala Export Processing Zone, Gujranwala, Punjab
 Khairpur Special Economic Zone, Khairpur, Sindh
 Rashakai Economic Zone Mardan Rashakai M1 KPK
 Gadoon Economic Zone Gadoon Amazai Swabi KPK
 Hathar Economic Zone Hathar Haripur KPK
 Quaid e Azam Business Park Sheikhupura

Panama
The Colon Free Zone (C.F.Z.) is located in the city of Colon at the Atlantic entrance to the Panama Canal dedicated to re-export of merchandise to Latin America and the Caribbean.

The Panama Pacifico Special Economic Area (PPSEA) was passed into law in 2004 in the Republic of Panama. It is located on the former Howard AFB, near Panama city, on the Pacific side of the isthmus.
 Colón Free Trade Zone
 Panama Pacifico Special Economic Area

Philippines

Philippine economic zones (ecozones) are collections of industries, brought together geographically for the purpose of promoting economic development. These ecozones were established through Republic Act No. 7916, otherwise known as "The Special Economic Zone Act of 1995" as amended by Republic Act No. 8748.

Philippine Ecozones are generally administered by the Philippine Economic Zone Authority through a board (PEZA Board), attached to the Department of Trade and Industry. The PEZA Board sets the general policies on the establishment and operations of the Ecozones, industrial estates, export processing zones, free trade zones, and the like. They also review proposals for the establishment of Ecozones, which they subsequently endorse to the president of the Republic of the Philippines. In addition, the PEZA Board regulates and undertakes the establishment, operation and maintenance of utilities, other services and infrastructure in the Ecozone, such as heat, light and power, water supply, telecommunications, transport, toll roads and bridges, port services, and the like.

Several incentives are granted to business establishments operating within Philippine Ecozones, particularly those found in the Omnibus Investments Code of 1987. These incentives include income tax holidays; zero percent (0%) duty on importation of capital equipment, spare parts, and accessories; exemption from wharfage dues and export tax, impost or fees; and the simplification of customs procedures, among others. In addition, The Special Economic Zone Act of 1995 exempts business establishments operating within Ecozones from all taxes. In lieu of paying all other taxes, business establishments are only required to pay five percent (5%) of their gross income to the national government.

Activities Eligible for PEZA Registration and Incentives include but are not limited to (1) Export Manufacturing; (2) Information Technology Service Export; (3) Tourism; (4) Medical Tourism; (5) Agro-industrial Export Manufacturing; (6) Agro-industrial Bio-Fuel Manufacturing; and (7) Logistics and Warehousing Services.

Although designed to operate separately from the political and economic milieu of surrounding communities, Philippine economic zones do in fact interact with their neighbors. As of 31 May 2010, there were more than 200 Ecozones in the Philippines. Of these more than 200 Ecozones, seven (7) are Agro-Industrial Economic Zones, 134 are Information Technology Parks and Centers, 65 are Manufacturing Ecozones, two (2) are Medical Tourism Parks/Centers, and nine (9) are Tourism Economic Zones. Of the 41 private economic zones, the biggest exporter is Gateway Business Park in General Trias, Cavite and the second biggest private ecozone is Laguna Technopark Inc. The four governmentally owned are Cavite Economic Zone, Bataan Economic Zone, Mactan Economic Zone and Baguio Economic Zone. Some of the more well-known Economic zones are the Clark Special Economic Zone, and Subic Economic Zone, former military bases of the United States of America.

Some of the over 200 SEZs in the Philippines are as follows:

 Subic Bay Metropolitan Authority (76.59 hectares)
 Clark Special Economic Zone (29,365 hectares)
 Freeport Area of Bataan (1,742.48 hectares)
 PHIVIDEC Industrial Authority
 Zamboanga City Special Economic Zone Authority
(16,119.56 hectares)

 Cagayan Special Economic Zone
 Aurora Pacific Economic Zone and Freeport Authority (APECO)
 Light Industry & Science Park I, II, & III (272.22 hectares)
 Laguna Technopark (289.95 hectares)
 Laguna International Industrial Park (34.88 hectares)
 Hermosa Ecozone Industrial Park (142.04 hectares)
 Keppel Philippines Marine Special Economic Zone (22.92 hectares)
 Filinvest Technology Park - Calamba (51.07 hectares)
 Carmelray Industrial Park I&II - Calamba (CIP I 60.86 hectares; CIP II 143.03 hectares)

Poland
There are fourteen SEZs in Poland.

Special economic zones (SSE is shortcut of Specjalna Strefa Ekonomiczna) in Poland:

 Kamienna Góra SEZ for Medium Business (Kamiennogórska SSE Małej Przedsiębiorczości)
 Katowice SEZ (Katowicka SSE)
 Kostrzyń-Słubice SEZ (Kostrzyńsko-Słubicka SSE)
 Kraków Technology Park (Krakowski Park Technologiczny)
 Legnica SEZ (Legnicka SSE)
 Łódź SEZ (Łódzka SSE)
 SEZ EURO-PARK MIELEC (SSE Euro-Park Mielec)
 Pomeranian SEZ (Pomorska SSE)
 Słupsk SEZ (Słupska SSE)
 Starachowice SEZ (SSE Starachowice)
 Suwałki SEZ (Suwalska SSE)
 Tarnobrzeg SEZ (Tarnobrzeska SSE)
 Wałbrzych SEZ "INVEST-PARK" (Wałbrzyska SSE)
 Warmian-Masurian SEZ (Warmińsko-Mazurska SSE)

Republic of Korea (South Korea)
Korean FEZs are designated by law to facilitate foreign investment, and thereby to strengthen national competitiveness and seek balanced development among regions by improving the business environment for foreign-invested enterprises and living conditions for foreigners.

There are eight Free Economic Zones in South Korea. The first three zones were created in 2003 and three more were created in 2008. In 2013, the East Coast and Chungbuk Economic Zones were declared.

 Incheon Free Economic Zone (IFEZ) in 2003
 Busan-Jinhae Free Economic Zone (BJFEZ) in 2004
 Gwangyang Free Economic Zone (GFEZ) in 2004
 Saemangeum Free Economic Zone (SGFEZ) in 2008
 Yellow Sea Free Economic Zone (YESFEZ) in 2008
 Daegu-Gyeongbuk Free Economic Zone (DGFEZ) in 2008
 East Coast Free Economic Zone (EFEZ) in 2013
 Chungbuk Free Economic Zone (CBFEZ) in 2013

Russia
Russia currently has 16 federal economic zones and several regional projects.

As of March 2010 Russia's federal special economic zones host 207 investors from 18 countries.
There are major MNCs among investors to Russia's SEZ, such as Yokohama, Cisco, Isuzu, Air Liquide, Bekaert, Rockwool and many others.

Russia's 15 existing and to-be federal special economic zones are managed by OJSC "Special Economic Zones".

OJSC "SEZ" was founded in 2006 to accumulate and implement world's best practices in developing and managing SEZ and promote Foreign direct investment (FDI) in the Russian economy. It is fully owned and funded by the Russian state.

Federal economic zones in Russia are regulated by Federal Law # 116 FZ issued on July 22, 2005.

Technical/Innovational Zones
 Dubna
 Zelenograd (Moscow)
 Area Alabushevo
 Area MIET
 Saint Petersburg
 Area Neudorf - area in Strelna near Saint Petersburg
 Area Novo-Orlovskoye - area in Saint Petersburg
 Tomsk
 Area North
 Area South
 Innopolis Special Economic Zone in the city of Innopolis

Industrial/developmental Zones
 “Alabuga” (special economic zone)
 Lipetsk
 SEZ Togliatti
 SEZ Titanium Valley"

Tourist Zones

 Krasnodar Krai
 Stavropol Krai
 Kaliningrad Oblast (Yantar, Kaliningrad Special Economic Zone)
 Altai Krai
 Altai Republic
 Irkutsk Oblast
 Buryatia
 Vladivostok

Saudi Arabia 
The Red Sea Project, a luxury tourist destination currently under construction, will "operate as a Special Economic Zone with its own laws and regulatory framework, specially created to encourage investment opportunities and commercial activities".

Spain 
The Canary Islands Special Tax Zone is a special tax regime included in the  Canary Islands Economic and Tax Regime providing for a reduced 4% Corporate Income Tax, exemption on dividends, interests and capital gains, exemption on VAT and exemption on transfer duties. A large list of activities qualify for applying for the special regime (main exclusions are accommodation, food and beverage, construction (but repair is eligible), financial, insurance and pure holding (substance-based corporate activities are not excluded)). The regime is applicable to new activities to be developed in the Canary Islands provided the creation of a minimum of three jobs. The regime is authorized by the European Commission, supervised by the Code of Conduct, and fully compliant with EU and OECD substance rules. Is run and controlled by the Consorcio de la Zona Especial Canaria, an agency of the Ministry of Finance and Public Service of the Government of Spain.

Thailand
Thailand has SEZs in the following provinces:

 Bordering Cambodia
Sa Kaeo Province
Trat Province

 Bordering Laos
Chiang Rai Province
Mukdahan Province
Nakhon Phanom Province
Nong Khai Province

 Bordering Malaysia
Narathiwat Province
Songkhla Province

 Bordering Myanmar
Kanchanaburi Province
Tak Province

Thailand's Board of Investment (BOI) estimates that in 2015, 20-25 percent of Thailand's exports were accounted for by border trade. The BOI identifies 13 Thai industries that benefit from SEZs: agriculture; ceramics; autos; electronics; plastics; gems; furniture; textiles; medical equipment; pharmaceuticals; logistics; tourism; and industrial estates. Companies in target industries will receive an eight-year tax exemption; import duty exemptions on machinery and raw materials; double deductions on transportation costs; cheap electricity and water for 10 years; a 25 percent deduction for facilities construction; faster licensing and permit issuance; improved infrastructure and customs services within the SEZ, and other non-tax incentives. Perhaps the biggest incentive is the exclusive right to use unskilled foreign labour as the Thai workforce is in decline. Because of inadequate infrastructure in the SEZs, the government approved infrastructure development plans for SEZs that saw 2.6 billion baht expended on 45 projects in 2015 and another 79 projects, worth 7.9 billion baht, to be completed in 2016.

Ukraine
Special Economic Zones existed in Ukraine until March 31, 2005. The first created was the Nouth-Crimean Experimental Economic Zone Syvash (since 1996). From 1998 to 2000 11 new zones were created.

Uzbekistan

Navoi Free Industrial Economic Zone - The Navoi Free Industrial Economic Zone was created on December 2, 2008 in the Navoi region of the Republic of Uzbekistan to attract foreign investment.
Jizzakh high-tech industrial park - Uzbekistan and China are working together to jointly establish a SEZ in the central Uzbek city Jizzakh. This high-tech industrial park will be formally established by March 2013. China Development Bank will provide a $50 million loan to finance several of the joint projects in the construction, agro-industrial and mechanical engineering sectors.

Zambia

Zambia is home to two SEZs developed in partnership with China Non-Ferrous Metal Mining corporation. One sitting just outside Lusaka focuses on garments, food, appliances, tobacco and electronics. The second is in the copper rich town of Chambishi and focuses on copper related industries. The zones combine expedited customs and administration procedures with tax incentives, to attract increased investment.

References

special